{{Infobox boxing match
| fight date = May 22, 2021
| Fight Name = Undisputed
| image = 
| location = Virgin Hotels Las Vegas, Paradise, Nevada, U.S.
| titles = WBA (Super), WBC, IBF, WBO, and The Ring light welterweight titles
| fighter1 = José Ramírez
| nickname1 = JCR
| record1 = 26–0 (17 KO)
| hometown1 = Avenal, California, U.S.
| height1 = 5 ft 10 in
| weight1 = 139+3/5 lbs
| style1 = Orthodox
| recognition1 = WBC and WBO light welterweight champion

| fighter2 = Josh Taylor
| nickname2 = The Tartan Tornado
| record2 = 17–0 (13 KO)
| hometown2 = Prestonpans, Scotland
| height2 = 5 ft 10 in
| weight2 = 139+3/5 lbs
| style2 = Southpaw
| recognition2 = WBA (Super), IBF, and The Ring light welterweight champion[[The Ring (magazine)|The Ring]] No. 9 ranked pound-for-pound fighter
| result = Taylor won via 12–round unanimous decision
}}

José Ramírez vs. Josh Taylor, billed as Undisputed'', was a unification professional boxing match contested between WBC and WBO champion, José Ramírez, and WBA (Super), IBF, and The Ring champion, Josh Taylor. The bout took place on May 22, 2021, at the Virgin Hotels in Paradise, Nevada. Taylor defeated Ramirez via unanimous decision to become the undisputed light welterweight champion.

Background
Ramírez became a unified light welterweight champion after defeating Maurice Hooker via technical knockout (TKO) in July 2019, retaining his WBC title (held since 2018) and capturing Hooker's WBO version. Less than 48 hours after successfully defending his titles against the WBC's mandatory challenger, Viktor Postol, via majority decision (MD) in August 2020, Ramírez was ordered to face the WBO's mandatory challenger, Jack Catterall.

Taylor captured his unified titles in 2019 as part of the World Boxing Super Series tournament, defeating IBF champion Ivan Baranchyk via unanimous decision (UD) in May and WBA (Super) champion Regis Prograis via MD in October, winning the vacant Ring title in the process. After nearly a year out of the ring, Taylor successfully retained his titles against the IBF's mandatory challenger, Apinun Khongsong of Thailand, via first-round knockout (KO) in September 2020, leaving Ramírez' mandatory defence against Catterall as the final obstacle to an undisputed fight.

In October, it was announced that Catterall had agreed to a "step-aside deal", with the promise of a chance to fight the winner of a proposed Ramírez vs. Taylor fight. At the beginning of March 2021, the fight was officially announced for May 22.

The fight
Ramírez was the more active of the two in rounds one to four, landing 25 out of 75 punches compared to Taylor's 11 out of 45. In the sixth, a round which saw Taylor suffer a small cut to the corner of his left eye, the Scotsman landed a short left-hand counter on Ramírez' jaw, knocking the American to the canvas. He made it back to his feet by the referee's count of two to see out the remainder of the round. Taylor scored a second knockdown in the final 30 seconds of the seventh round after landing a left uppercut, leaving Ramírez visibly hurt. He again made it to his feet, albeit slower than the first time, with 10 seconds left in the round. The next five rounds were closely contested, with both men finding success. All three judges scored the bout in favour of Taylor with 114–112, giving the Scotsman a unanimous decision victory to become Scotland's second ever undisputed champion after Ken Buchanan. According to CompuBox statistics, Taylor landed 145 out of 530 (27%) punches compared to Ramírez' 134 out of 584 (23%).

Fight card

Media coverage 

SCO - as the away boxer from Scotland

References

2021 in boxing
Boxing in Las Vegas
2021 in American sports
2021 in sports in Nevada
May 2021 sports events in the United States